The little forest bat (Vespadelus vulturnus) is a species of vesper bat in the family Vespertilionidae. It is found only in south-eastern Australia, including Tasmania. It is the smallest bat in Tasmania

Biology and ecology
The little forest bat is one of the most commonly observed bats in south-eastern Australia, it is found in a variety of habitats including Eucalypt woodlands and forests as well as in rural, semi-rural and some urban areas. It is an insectivore and roosts in tree hollows.

Females become sexually mature in their first year and males in their second year. It is assumed the males wake from torpor and mate with the females during winter. A single pup is born in spring (October–November).

Identification
The little forest bat is very small with pale grey or brownish fur. The tragus is usually white and the skin on the face, feet and forearm is usually pinkish. Females are slightly larger than males.

The little forest bat is very similar in appearance and often confused with a number of other bats that it co-occurs with ( sympatric) including Vespadelus regulus, Vespadelus darlingtoni, Vespadelus baverstocki, Vespadelus troughtoni, Vespadelus pumilus and Scotorepens greyii. Live bats can be differentiated from these species using a combination of size, relative finger bone lengths and, in males, penis shape. Males have a distinctly shaped baculum. There is some variation in the morphology of this species across its range, with some taxonomists suggesting there may be cryptic species that have not yet been identified within the species.

Echolocation call
The echolocation call of the little forest bat is regionally variable, in New South Wales the characteristic frequency of search phase calls is between 42.5 and 53 kilohertz depending on the region where it is found. This is more than double the maximum frequency of the human hearing range and cannot be heard without the assistance of a bat detector.

References

Bats of Australia
Vespadelus
Mammals of Tasmania
Mammals of South Australia
Mammals of New South Wales
Mammals of Victoria (Australia)
Mammals described in 1914
Taxa named by Oldfield Thomas
Taxonomy articles created by Polbot
Vertebrates of Tasmania